Annasofía Facello (born 26 November 1986) is a Uruguayan actress and television presenter.

Career 
Her beginnings in television was as a production assistant on the Channel 10 show Consentidas, and later on Lo mejor de lo mejor. In 2011 she made her first on-screen appearance as a reporter for the show Conectados. From 2012 to 2014 she was part of Yo y 3 más hosted by Jorge Piñeyrúa, which allowed her to be awarded the Revelation Award in Television, at the 20th Iris Awards. She was the co-host of the Uruguayan version of Raid the Cage, Escape Perfecto and of its spin-off featuring celebrities with Claudia Fernández.

In 2019 she hosted the brewers reality show Brew Master, a reality show broadcast on Channel 10. In June 2020, together with Noelia Ethceverry, she hosted the spin-off program of Got Talent Uruguay, Amamos el talento. In 2021 she starred in the short film Made in China and hosted Bake Off Uruguay on Channel 4.

Filmography

Television

Awards and nominations

References

External links 
 

Uruguayan television presenters
Uruguayan women television presenters
Uruguayan actresses
1986 births
Living people